Sir David Michael Waksman (born 28 August 1957) is a British High Court judge.

Waksman was educated at Royal Grammar School in Newcastle. He completed an LLB from University of Manchester and the BCL at St Catherine's College, Oxford.

He was called to the bar at Middle Temple in 1982 and practised from Fountain Chambers, specialising in commercial law. He took silk in 2002. He served as recorder from 2001 to 2007. In 2007 he left practice to become a full-time specialist senior circuit judge, which he served as until 2018. He was appointed a deputy High Court judge in 2005 in was from 2015 judge in charge of the London Mercantile Court until 2018.

On 1 October 2018, he was appointed to a judge of the High Court and assigned to the Queen's Bench Division. He took the customary knighthood in the same year. He hears cases in the Commercial Court, the Technology and Construction Court; he is the designated judge of the Planning Court and is authorised to sit on the Competition Appeal Tribunal and the Administrative Court.

References 

Living people
1957 births
21st-century English judges
Knights Bachelor
Alumni of the University of Manchester
Alumni of St Catherine's College, Oxford
Members of the Middle Temple
English King's Counsel
21st-century King's Counsel